Les Fleurs du mal (suite et fin) (English: "The Flowers of Evil (last and final)") is an album by Léo Ferré, posthumously released in 2008 by La Mémoire et la Mer. It is his third musical effort dedicated to Charles Baudelaire's poetry, after the seminal Les Fleurs du mal in 1957 and the expanding double LP Léo Ferré chante Baudelaire in 1967.

History
This posthumous album brings together all the demo versions Léo Ferré recorded by himself, at home in Tuscany, between the summer of 1976 and winter 1977. The French singer-songwriter initially aimed to record a new baudelairian double album in 1977, as it was both anniversary dates of Les Fleurs du mal first publication (1857) and Baudelaire's death (1867). For unknown reasons, Ferré never completed this project. It remains a piano and a voice, bare and intimate.

Nevertheless, Ferré orchestrated and recorded twos demos here in 1986 (Je te donne ces vers afin que si mon nom and L'Examen de minuit - Bien loin d'ici), to release them on On n'est pas sérieux quand on a dix-sept ans.

Track listing
Texts by Charles Baudelaire. Music composed and played by Léo Ferré at the piano.

Credits 
 Tape restoration and mastering at Studio La Buissonne
 Cover photography: Hubert Grooteclaes, Nadar
 Package Art & Design: Rinaldo Maria Chiesa & Vital Maladrech
 Liner notes: Mathieu Ferré, Alain Raemackers
 Compiled and Coordinated by Mathieu Ferré & Alain Raemackers

External links 
 Album listening & presentation (French)

Léo Ferré albums
Les Fleurs du mal in popular culture
French-language albums
2008 albums
Musical settings of poems by Charles Baudelaire